The following productions and persons were nominated for the 28th NAACP Theatre Awards. 

Best Choreography — Larger Theatre

 The Legend of Georgia McBride — Paul McGill
 Summer: The Donna Summer Musical — Sergio Trujillo
 Born For This ~ Warren Adams

Best Choreography — 99 Seat Theatre

 Les Blancs — Toyce Guy
 Punk Rock - Matthew Glave
 Runaway Home ~ Janet Roston

Best Costumes ~ Larger Theatre

 Summer: The Donna Summer Musical — Paul Tazewell
 The Legend of Georgia McBride ~ EB. Brooks
 Born For This ~ William Ivey Long

Best Costumes — 99 Seat Theatre

 Transition — Kate Bergh
 Les Blanes — Wendell C. Carmichael
 Antony and Cleopatra — Gloria Gifford, Lauren Plaxco and Lucy Walsh

Best Director — Larger Theatre

 Head of Passes — Tina Landau
 Zoot Suit — Luis Valdez
 The Legend of Georgia McBride ~ Mike Donahue

Best Director — 99 Seat Theatre

 The Meeting — Bill Cobbs
 Lyrics from Lockdown — Gina Belafonte
 Runaway Home ~ Shirley Jo Finney

Best Director of a Musical — Larger Theatre

 Born For This - Charles Randolph-Wright
 Shout Sister Shout — Randy Johnson
 Summer: The Donna Summer Musical - Des McAnuff

Best Director of a Musical - 99 Seat

 Antony and Cleopatra — Gloria Gifford
 Can God's Love ~ Spencer M. Collins IV
 Walking in Dorothy Dandridge's Shoes.
 Her Final New Beginning - Wanda Ray Willis

Best Ensemble Cast —Larger Theatre

 Summer: The Donna Summer Musical
 Home
 946: The Amazing Story of Adolphus Tips

Best Ensemble Cast — 99 Seat Theatre

 The Meeting
 Periphery
 Les Blancs

Best Lead Female - Larger Theatre

 Head of Passes — Phylicia Rashad
 Born For This - Deborah Joy Winans
 Trouble in Mind — Eamestine Phillips

Best Lead Female — 99 Seat Theatre

 An Accident — Kacie Rogers
 This Land — LeShay Tomlinson Boyce
 Br'er Cotton - Yvonne Huff Lee
 This Land — Niketa Calame

Best Lead Male — Larger Theatre

 Born For This — Juan Winans
 Between Riverside and Crazy — John Cothran
 Driving Miss Daisy - Arthur Richardson

Best Lead Male — 99 Seat Theatre

 Br'er Cotton — Omete Anassi
 An Accident ~ Kent Faulcon
 Transitions - Joshua Wolf Coleman

Best Lighting — Larger Theatre

 Summer: The Donna Summer Musical — Howell Binkley
 Head of Passes — Jeff Croiter
 Born For This — Jason Lyons

Best Lighting - 99 Seat Theatre

 Transition — Donny Jackson
 Les Blancs — Derrick McDaniel
 King Hedley Il - Derek Jones

Best Music Director Larger Theatre

 Bom For This - Jaret Landon
 Shout Sister Shout - Rahn Coleman
 Summer: The Donna Summer Musical — Ron Melrose

Best Music Director ~ 99 Seat Theatre

 Love is a Dirty Word — Giovanni Adams
 Elevator — Mario Marchetti
 Can God's Love - Cedric Lily

Best One Person Show — Larger Theatre

 Tum Me Loose — Joe Morton

Best One Person Show - 99 Seat Theatre

 Lyrics from Lockdown ~ Byronn Bain
 Love is a Dirty Word — Giovanni Adams
 Conversation “Bout the Girls - Sonia Jackson

Best Playwright — Larger Theatre

 Born for This - Bebe Winans and Charles Randolph- Wright
 Summer: The Donna Summer Musical — Colman Domingo, Robert Cary and Des McAnuff
 Head of Passes — Tarrell Alvin Me Craney

Best Playwright — 99 Seat Theatre

 King Hedley II - August Wilson
 This Land — Evangeline Ordaz
 An Accident — Lydia Stryk

Best Producer — Larger Theatre

 Tum Me Loose — John Legend (Get Lifted Film Company) & Mike Jackson
 Born For This - My Destiny Productions and Ron Gillyard
 Summer: The Donna Summer Musical — Lalolla Playhouse

Best Producer — 99 Seat Theatre

 This Land — Company of Angels, Danny Munoz & Tamadhur Al-Ageel
 The Meeting - Shannon Sylvain
 King Hedley II — Sophina Brown

Best Set Design — Larger Theatre

 Head of Passes — G. W. Mercier
 Summer: The Donna Summer Musical — Robert Brill
 Big Night — John Lee Beatty

Best Set Design - 99 Seat Theatre

 This Land — Justine Huen
 Bee-luther Hatchee — Christopher Scott Murillo
 King Hedley Il — John Iacovelli

Best Sound ~ Larger Theatre

 Summer: The Donna Summer Musical — Gareth Owen
 Head of Passes - Rob Milbum and Michael Bodeen
 Shout Sister Shout — Jon Gottlieb

Best Sound — 99 Seat Theatre

 Transition — David Marling
 Les Blancs — Jeff Gardner
 King Hedley Il - Kevin Novinsky

Best Supporting Female ~ Larger Theatre

 Born For This - Nita Whitaker
 Born For This ~ Kirsten Wyatt Born
 Born For This - Kiandra Richardson

Best Supporting Female ~ 99 Seat Theatre

 Peace Be Still - Brely Evans
 Peace Be Still - Anika McFall
 Punk Rock ~ Raven Scott
 Runaway Home - Karen Malina White

Best Supporting Male — Larger Theatre

 Born For This - Milton Craig Nealy
 Five Guys Named Moe - Rogelio Douglas, Jr
 The Legend of Georgia McBride — Larry Powell

Best Supporting Male — 99 Seat Theatre

 King Hedley I — Adolphus Ward Punk
 Rock — Jacob B. Gibson
 Bret Cotton — Christopher Carrington

References 

NAACP Theatre Awards